The Herald-Press is a weekly newspaper published in Harvey, North Dakota in the United States.  It was founded in 1985 by Charles Eldredge, who merged the Harvey Herald with the Wells County Free Press of Fessenden.  Eldredge retired in 2001.  The paper's circulation is around 2,100.

External links
The Herald-Press website

Newspapers published in North Dakota
Wells County, North Dakota